Her Wild Oat (1927) is a silent comedy film made by First National Pictures, directed by Marshall Neilan, and starring Colleen Moore. The screenplay was written by Gerald C. Duffy, based on a story by Howard Irving Young.

History
This was Moore's first film after a contract dispute between her, her husband John McCormick, and her studio First National caused the couple to suddenly leave California for New York, with the intentions of making films either with another studio or overseas. Their problems were solved and Her Wild Oat was made upon her return. Originally they had planned to make Synthetic Sin, but it was necessary to complete the film quickly. Her Wild Oat was a simple story (originally racier until rewritten by Neilan to play up the comic aspects), and could be shot entirely in California (even though it is set in the New York area... palm trees can be seen in the background of the resort supposedly on the east coast) and mostly on location and using existing sets. Colleen wrote in Silent Star that her husband, a heavy drinker, had decided to re-edit the film while Colleen was on vacation. She returned to find the tops of all the gags had been removed.

It was her second film directed by Marshall Neilan, the first being Dinty (1920). Marshall also produced Social Register (1934) with Moore, one of her last four films before retiring from Hollywood.

The film was thought to be lost but a copy was found by Hugh Neely in the Czech National Film Archive in Prague in 2001 and subsequently restored by the Academy Film Archive.

Cast
Colleen Moore as  Mary Lou Smith
Larry Kent as  Philip Latour
Hallam Cooley as  Tommy Warren
Gwen Lee as  Daisy
Martha Mattox as  Dowager
Charles Giblyn as  Duke Latour
Julanne Johnston as  Miss Whitley

References
Notes

Bibliography
Jeff Codori (2012), Colleen Moore; A Biography of the Silent Film Star, McFarland Publishing,(Print , EBook ).

External links

 
 
Colleen Moore and the Making of Her Wild Oat

American black-and-white films
1927 films
1927 comedy films
American silent feature films
First National Pictures films
Films directed by Marshall Neilan
1920s rediscovered films
Silent American comedy films
Films with screenplays by Gerald Duffy
Rediscovered American films
1920s English-language films
1920s American films